Agonimia is a genus of lichen-forming fungi in the family Verrucariaceae.

Species

Agonimia abscondita  – Australia
Agonimia allobata 
Agonimia ascendens 
Agonimia blumii 
Agonimia borysthenica  – Ukraine
Agonimia bryophilopsis 
Agonimia cavernicola 
Agonimia deguchii  – Japan
Agonimia flabelliformis  – Europe
Agonimia foliacea 
Agonimia gelatinosa 
Agonimia globulifera  – Europe
Agonimia koreana 
Agonimia loekoesii 
Agonimia octospora 
Agonimia opuntiella 
Agonimia repleta  – Europe
Agonimia sunchonensis  – South Korea
Agonimia tenuiloba  – Brazil
Agonimia tristicula 
Agonimia vouauxii 
Agonimia yongsangensis  – South Korea

References

Eurotiomycetes genera
Lichen genera
Verrucariales
Taxa named by Alexander Zahlbruckner
Taxa described in 1909